Mutable Set is the fourth studio album by American singer-songwriter Blake Mills. It was released on May 8, 2020 under Verve Records and New Deal Records.

Critical reception
Mutable Set was met with universal acclaim from critics. At Metacritic, which assigns a weighted average rating out of 100 to reviews from mainstream publications, this release received an average score of 84, based on 7 reviews.

Track listing
Track listing from Tidal

References

2020 albums
Verve Records albums